Bekzod Abdurakhmonov - Uzbekistani freestyle wrestler and mixed martial artist. 
Ilgar Abdurahmanov - Azerbaijani former professional football player.
Sherzod Abdurahmonov - Uzbekistani boxer
Salijon Abdurahmanov - Uzbekistani journalist who contributed to Radio Free Europe, Voice of America and uznews.net.